Sleep Train Amphitheatre may refer to

Sleep Train Amphitheatre (Chula Vista, California)
Sleep Train Amphitheatre (Wheatland, California)